Lottie Collins (16 August 1865 – 1 May 1910) was an English singer and dancer, most famous for introducing the song "Ta-ra-ra Boom-de-ay!" in England.

Early life
She was born Charlotte Louisa Collins in the East End of London in 1865. Her father was a woodworker and music hall entertainer. She started out in music hall at the age of 11 or 12 in 1877 in a skipping rope dance act with her younger sisters, Eliza (Lizzie) and Mary Ann (Marie) as The Three Sisters Collins.

Career
In 1886, Collins became a solo act in music hall. She also played in theatre, appearing the same year as Mariette in the Gaiety Theatre's burlesque, Monte Cristo Jr.  She first toured America in 1889 with the Howard Atheneum Company, during which she accepted the proposal of Samuel P. Cooney whom she married in St. Louis.  According to her obituary in the New York Times she and Cooney had three children.

While touring in vaudeville in the United States she heard the song "Ta-ra-ra Boom-de-ay!"  After she sang it at the Tivoli Music Hall in London in November 1891, it became her signature piece.  She would sing the first verse demurely and then launch into the chorus and an uninhibited and exhausting skirt dance with high kicks (especially on the word "BOOM") that exposed her stockings held up by sparkling garters, and bare thighs.  She sang the song at performances of the Gaiety Theatre's burlesque Cinder Ellen up too Late beginning on 14 March 1892 and according to her obituary, at the height of the craze was performing it five times nightly at different venues in London.

She returned to America in September 1892 to perform "Ta-ra-ra-Boom-de-ay" as an entr'acte at the Standard Theatre, New York, but received a bad review from the critic of the New York Times, who described her as 'a mature woman', referred to her as 'Charlotte Collins' and mentioned she had been detained in quarantine when arriving 'on an infected ship'. Another of Collins's dance sketches in the 1890s was The Little Widow, and she also had a hit with the song Daddy Wouldn't Buy Me A Bow-wow.  On 29 November 1897 she opened in New York again at the Garden Theatre, part of a triple bill with two short plays. She became an icon of the "Naughty Nineties" and her risqué style led to some criticism, against which she defended herself. A century later, her garters were sold by auction at Sotheby's.

Family
Lottie had three daughters, Lottie Lucia, José and Cleopatra.  
José Collins went on to be a musical comedy star. In 1902 she married her second husband, the composer-producer James W. Tate.
Lottie Lucia (or Lucia Lottie) Collins, a mezzo soprano, appeared in vaudeville on the Australian Tivoli circuit, March–August 1911. She was at the time married to one J. A. R. Cargill; they divorced in 1912. She returned to Australia in 1921 to play "principal boy" pantomime roles. She had undergone a form of marriage with one John Sydney Phillips in London in October 1917, but discovered when she arrived in Sydney that he already had a wife and was penniless.

Death
In 1898 she apparently attempted suicide by cutting her wrists and neck with a penknife, but her wounds were minor and she was discharged from hospital the same day.

She died on 1 May 1910 at St Pancras of heart disease and is buried at St Pancras and Islington Cemetery, East Finchley, London.

References

External links

Music Hall and Variety Artistes Burial Places at www.arthurlloyd.co.uk
Lottie Collins; Gabriel Elleray
Ta-ra-ra-boom-de-ay melody

 Lottie Collins University of Arizona Libraries, Special Collections(American Vaudeville Museum Archive)

1865 births
1910 deaths
Music hall performers
Vaudeville performers
People from St Pancras, London
Burials at St Pancras and Islington Cemetery